Jurasaidae is a family of elateroid beetles known from around a half-dozen species in two genera found the Brazilian Atlantic rainforest including drier transitional areas bordering the Caatinga. All known species have neotenic larva-like females and normal males, similar to some other elateroids. They occur in the soil horizon immediately under leaf litter, with the larvae likely being fungivorous, consuming the fluids of fungal hyphae.

Taxonomy 
 Genus Jurasai Rosa et al., 2020
 Jurasai digitusdei Rosa et al., 2020
 Jurasai itajubense Rosa et al., 2020
 Jurasai miraculum Biffi et al., 2021
 Jurasai vanini Biffi et al., 2021
 Jurasai ypauoca Roza, 2021
 Genus Tujamita Rosa et al.., 2020
 Tujamita plenalatum Rosa et al., 2020

References

Elateroidea
Polyphaga families